American singer Demi Lovato has released eight studio albums since her solo debut in 2008. This has resulted in six concert tours (five of them worldwide), and live TV and award shows performances. Her debut promotional tour in 2008, Demi Live! Warm Up Tour was based in North America only and supported her debut studio album, Don't Forget. At the same year, Lovato served as one of the opening acts for the Jonas Brothers on her fifth concert tour, Burnin' Up Tour and for Avril Lavigne on her third concert tour, The Best Damn World Tour on selected dates in North America.

In 2009, Lovato performed as the opening act on the Jonas Brothers World Tour 2009 during the South American and European legs, before she headlined her first tour, Demi Lovato: Live in Concert during Summer 2009. The tour was in support of  Don't Forget and her second album Here We Go Again. In 2010, Lovato performed as the opening act on Jonas Brothers' Live in Concert World Tour 2010. On November 1, 2010, Lovato left the tour to receive professional help for personal issues.

During 2011 till 2013, Lovato embarked on her second headlining concert tour, A Special Night with Demi Lovato to promote her third studio album Unbroken. Lovato performed 68 shows and visited North America, South America, Asia and Europe, grossing over $47 million. In 2014, Lovato was named the Grand Marshall and headliner of Los Angeles Pride.

Lovato embarked on her third headlining concert tour, The Neon Lights Tour to promote her self-titled fourth studio album Demi. During the tour, Lovato performed 44 shows and visited North America, South America and Europe. To further promote Demi, Lovato embarked on her fourth headlining concert tour, Demi World Tour in 2014 till 2015. During most of the European tour dates in 2014, Lovato supported Spanish singer Enrique Iglesias on his twelfth concert tour Sex and Love Tour. In 2016, Lovato and American singer Nick Jonas embarked on her co-headlining concert tour Future Now Tour as part of the 15th Annual Honda Civic Tour visiting 41 cities in North America and Europe,

In 2018, Lovato embarked on her fifth headlining tour, Tell Me You Love Me World Tour in support of her sixth studio album, Tell Me You Love Me, visiting 43 cities in North America and Europe. According to Billboard Boxscore, the North American leg of the tour generated $20 million in ticket sales and played to 260,763 fans over 20 shows. The highest grossing show of the leg was at Brooklyn's Barclays Center, playing for 15,249 and grossing $1.5 million. Washington D.C.'s Capital One Arena drew the largest crowd of the leg with a total of 16,141 tickets sold.

Concert tours

Co-headlining tours

Promotional tours

Festival appearances

Live performances

Don't Forget era

Here We Go Again era

Unbroken era

Demi era

Confident era

Tell Me You Love Me era

Dancing with the Devil... the Art of Starting Over era

Holy Fvck era

References

External links
 
 Tours of Demi Lovato at Live Nation

Demi Lovato
Demi Lovato